Auckland United Football Club is an amateur football club based in Mount Roskill, New Zealand.

Formed in 2020 as an amalgamation between Onehunga Sports and Three Kings United, Auckland United currently competes in the Northern League, one of three qualifying leagues for the New Zealand National League and New Zealand Women's National League.

The club also competes in the Chatham Cup and Kate Sheppard Cup, New Zealand's premier knockout tournaments for men and women respectively. Both teams received byes in the 2021 Chatham Cup and 2021 Kate Sheppard Cup for the preliminary and first round, along with other ranked teams. The men got their first win of the Chatham Cup when they beat Cambridge 9–0, the women's team also won their first game 9–0 over Papamoa FC in the Kate Sheppard Cup.

Current squad

References

External links
Club website

Association football clubs in Auckland
2020 establishments in New Zealand